Joyner is a suburb in the Moreton Bay Region, Queensland, Australia. It is part of the Brisbane metropolitan area.

Geography 
Joyner is located east of, and is contiguous with Lake Samsonvale. The area was originally known as Harrisons Pocket before the modern day adaptation and implementation of the name Joyner.

Essentially, the Joyner area may be considered one of the numerous sub-catchments of the North Pine River drainage basin. This basin extends from the western ranges all the way to Moreton Bay.

The origin of the name Joyner is from the Joyner family, early settlers in the area.

History

The median age of the Joyner population was 34 years, 3 years below the national median of 37. Of people living in Joyner, 78.7% were born in Australia. The other top responses for country of birth were New Zealand (5.1%), England (4.1%), South Africa (2.5%), Ireland (0.4%), and Fiji (0.4%). Of the people 92% spoke only English at home; the next most common languages were Afrikaans (0.8%), Hindi (0.4%), Spanish (0.4%), Samoan, and Italian (0.3%).

Industries

The most notable feature of the area is the North Pine Dam and Treatment Plant which supplies a significant volume of potable water to the Moreton Bay Region and Brisbane City utilising water from Lake Samsonvale. The Plant supplies water in the order of 100ML per day.

Joyner is also home to the bus depot of Thompsons Bus Service, which operates bus services mostly in the Pine Rivers District area.

Amenities 
Forgan Road which runs along the eastern shore of Lake Samsonvale, gives access to popular fishing and picnic spots making the area a valuable recreational resource for locals and visitors. Important centres for recreational activities exist at Bullocky Rest and also at Forgan Cove, near the intersection with Samsonvale Road. Forgan Cove has been designated as a zone for paddle craft use by the public on the lake.

Lake Samsonvale is stocked with several native fish species. These facilities have been provided by the South East Queensland Water Board.

One Mile Creek more or less bisects Joyner south-west to north-east and enters the North Pine River south of Nelson Road. Pleasant parks have been established along the creek banks in several areas adding to the amenity of the locality.

Joyner is also home to a popular YMCA camp, Camp Warrawee, off Byrnes Road North, and bordered by the North Pine River on the northern and western sides. The camp has been established for many decades and utilises the river for many recreational and youth development activities such as canoeing. The Camp has accommodation for 232.

At the confluence of North Pine River and Sideling Creek off Youngs Crossing Road, a large sand bank forms the basis for a popular swimming and fishing area. This natural feature has been enhanced with facilities provided by Moreton Bay Regional Council.

References

External links
 

Suburbs of Moreton Bay Region